Ksenia Milevskaya and Urszula Radwańska were the defending champions, but did not compete in the juniors that year.

Noppawan Lertcheewakarn and Sandra Roma won the tournament, defeating Mallory Burdette and Sloane Stephens in the final, 6–0, 6–2.

Seeds

Draw

Finals

Top half

Bottom half

External links 
 Draw

Girls' Doubles
US Open, 2008 Girls' Doubles